Brandon Bogotay (born May 8, 1989) is an American football placekicker.

High school years
Bogotay attended Patrick Henry High School in his hometown of San Diego, California.

College career
Before attending the University of Georgia, Bogotay spent one season at Grossmont College in El Cajon, California, where he was named a First-team All-Southern Conference selection after completing 15 of 15 PAT kicks and converting 15-of-23 field goals with a long of 52 yards.

A three-year letterman as a kicker at the University of Georgia (2009–11), Bogotay appeared in 14 contests, while kicking behind current Minnesota Vikings kicker Blair Walsh, who as a rookie in 2012 was voted to the NFC Pro Bowl squad. During his collegiate career, Bogotay handled kickoff duties as eight of his 29 career kickoffs went for touchbacks. He also converted all seven career PATs. As a senior, he made one of two field goal attempts, as his only miss came from 52 yards.

Professional career
Bogotay signed with the Cleveland Browns on April 2, 2013 to compete with veteran Shayne Graham in trying to replace pro bowl kicker Phil Dawson. He was released by the Cleveland Browns on August 31, 2013. In the same move the Browns also released veteran kicker Graham and 13 other players.

Bogotay signed with the Tampa Bay Buccaneers on May 28, 2015.

References

External links
Tampa Bay Buccaneers bio 

1989 births
Living people
Players of American football from San Diego
American football placekickers
Georgia Bulldogs football players
Cleveland Browns players
Tampa Bay Buccaneers players
Patrick Henry High School (California) alumni